Arthur Griffiths may refer to:

Arthur Griffiths (author) (1838–1908), prison administrator and author
Arthur Griffiths (footballer, born 1879) (1879–1955), footballer for Bristol Rovers and Notts County
Arthur Griffiths (cyclist) (1881–?), British Olympic cyclist
Arthur Griffiths (footballer, born 1885) (1885–1944), footballer for Stoke City and Oldham
Arthur Griffiths (footballer, born 1908) (1914–1995), footballer for Torquay, Rochdale and Stoke City
Arthur Griffiths (businessman) (born 1957), Canadian businessman, philanthropist, and former candidate for political office

See also
Arthur Griffin (disambiguation)
Arthur Griffith (disambiguation)